Bramley is a  district in west Leeds, West Yorkshire, England. It is part of the City of Leeds Ward of Bramley and Stanningley with a population of 21,334 at the 2011 Census.  The area is an old industrial area with much 19th century architecture and 20th century council housing in the east and private suburban housing in the west.

Etymology
The name of Bramley is first attested in the 1086 Domesday Book as Brameleia and Bramelei. The name derives from the Old English words brōm ('broom') and lēah ('open land in a wood'). Thus the name once meant 'open land characterised by broom'.

History

At the time of the Domesday survey, the nucleus of the settlement was probably located at Stocks Hill, and it developed in a linear fashion along today's Town Street.

The surviving water pump and stone water trough on Stocks Hill remain from Bramley's medieval past. The accompanying blue plaque states "Stocks Hill, Bramley.  This historic pump and trough are the last reminders of  Bramley Village Green which was surrounded by medieval cottages and yards.  The Green featured the stocks, pillory and an 8ft pillar which commemorated the holding of Leeds Market here during the plague of 1644-45".

The area experienced an industrial boom and an associated population increase in the 19th century, mostly because of the development of the woollen textile industry in the early part of the century and due to the boot making and engineering industries in its later part. The antiquarian Benjamin Wilson was the first person to write a history of Bramley, published in 1860. He donated his collection to Leeds City Museum, including a witch's bottle found in White Coat (White Cote), Bramley in 1861.

In 1873, bishop John Gott and H. M. Gott erected a stone cross with Anglo Saxon style carving to celebrate 8 years of living and working in Bramley, it now stands in a walled garden, although in the 1980s it stood at the park entrance.

Mary Gawthorpe described her experience living and working at Hough Lane School in Bramley between 1905 and 1907 in her autobiography. She recalls: 'Bramley was an oasis of peace, and old established centre of homes and living yet within the city bounds... from our kitchen at Warrel's Mount we looked out on open fields. The walk to school was almost rural in its calm'.

Much of Bramley was redeveloped in the 1960s and 1970s, albeit in an unsympathetic manner that damaged the historic integrity of the area and altered the appearance and the character of the town significantly. The Bramley Shopping Centre replaced the former town centre, and was Leeds' second purpose-built town centre after Seacroft town centre. Unlike Seacroft, the Bramley Shopping Centre replaced an existing town centre. The redevelopment replaced substandard shops and houses; many of the shops and cottages were dilapidated and in need of repair. From 2008, following a time of deterioration of the shopping centre, new anchor stores such as Farmfoods and Tesco took over existing premises or occupied new ones in the course of a general refit.

The redevelopment of Bramley was condemned by English Heritage as one of the least sensitive redevelopment programmes in Yorkshire. In 2008 the Yorkshire Evening Post ran an article describing the redevelopment of a "once-picturesque area", and questioning the replacement of an historic Yorkshire town centre. Much of historical Bramley is now protected by the  Bramley Town Conservation Area, which focuses on the area around Bramley Park across to Hough Lane.

Community
Bramley lies within the Parliamentary constituency of Leeds West. The Member of Parliament is Labour MP Rachel Reeves.

Parks and open areas for outdoor recreation include Bramley Falls Wood, which runs beside the Leeds and Liverpool Canal, and Bramley Park, which contains an underground reservoir at its highest point. At Bramley Park a fireworks display and the Bramley Carnival is held most years.

Bramley Baths are an example of Edwardian swimming baths. Built in 1904, and restored, it has a 25-yard pool, a gymnasium and a Russian steam room. The baths were used for dances during its early years, when the pool was covered with a large dance floor. The baths are the only remaining example of an Edwardian era bath-house in Leeds today and are a Grade II listed structure. The baths were built on the site of an iron foundry and the original foundry chimney, built with over 8,000 Kirkstall bricks, still towers over the baths and can be seen across Leeds. The four Georgian style houses built  to the right-hand side of the baths were the original homes of the iron foundry owner and his three children.

Bramley Shopping Centre is a 1960s-style concrete shopping plaza which was erected to replace the traditional stone-built village centre. Shops include charity shops, banks, bakeries, pawnbrokers, supermarkets, a post office, Greggs, Pizza Hut Delivery, a dental practice, beauty salons and fast food takeaways.

Estates in Bramley which have residents' associations include Moorside and Ganners, Landseer, Rossefield, and Newlay and Whitecote. LILAC, an affordable green co-housing project is based in Bramley.

Bramley churches include those for Baptist, Roman Catholics, Jehovah's Witnesses, and Methodists (Trinity Methodist Church), and two Anglican churches, St. Peter's (pictured) and St. Margaret's.

Bramley railway station (off Stanningley Road) is on the Leeds-Bradford Line. Bramley is accessible by bus routes from Leeds city centre, operated by First Leeds.

Bramley Juniors Football Club was established 1994 and runs with open-age teams. The club developed from one under-9s club in 1994. Bramley rugby league club is the Bramley Buffaloes (previously Bramley), and the Rugby union club, the Bramley Phoenix Rugby Union Club.

Notable people

 Mary Gawthorpe, the suffragette, socialist, trade unionist and editor, lived and worked in Bramley as a school teacher.
Ernie Wise, of Morecambe and Wise fame (born in Bramley and brought up in East Ardsley from a young age).
Major John Geoffrey Appleyard DSO, MC and Bar Commando and SAS War Hero was born in Bramley in 1916. 
Jamie Peacock MBE, English professional rugby league footballer who played for the Leeds Rhinos and the Bradford Bulls in the Super League, and captained both Great Britain and England at international level, was born in Bramley in 1977.

Location grid

See also
Listed buildings in Leeds (Bramley and Stanningley Ward)

References

External links

Bramley Baptist Church website
War Memorial website
Trinity Methodist Church, Bramley
Bramley Buffaloes
Bramley Park

LILAC

Places in Leeds